Hinduism is the majority religion of Indians living in Goa. According to the 2011 census, in a population of 1,458,545 people, 66.1% were Hindu.

History and roots 
Due to the Christianisation of Goa, over 90% of the Goans in the Velhas Conquistas became Catholic by the 1700s. The Novas Conquistas, which came under Portuguese rule later, remained majority Hindu. Goan emigration to British India and the rest of the world, and corresponding immigration of non-Goan labour from  India to work in mines in 1950s led to Hindus eventually becoming the majority of people residing in Goa by the 1960 census carried out by the Portuguese.

The massive influx of non-Goan immigrants from other states of India since the Annexation of Goa has further increased the Hindu population resident in Goa. Traditions of ethnic Goan Hindus after 1961 include festivals with processions wherein the deities are taken from the newly built temples in the Novas Conquistas to their original sites in the Velhas Conquistas.

While the Caste system in Goa is still a major factor among Goan Hindus, the egalitarian Indian constitution and the resulting affirmative action has helped to a perceived degree.

Goan Hindus celebrate the Yatra of Shree Mahadeva Shiva and Shree Mahadevi Shantadurga (Durga) besides those of other deities. The festival of Holi is called Shigmo in Goa and celebrated with gaiety. Chavath or Ganesh festival as it is called by Goan Hindus is a major festival in Goa. Deepaavali is celebrated with the lighting of the deepstambs in the temples and with the burning of effigies of the evil demon Narakasur who was vanquished  on the day before Diwali by Shri Krishna.

The Goan Hindu community is composed of 1% Saraswat Brahmins, Daivadnya Brahmins and other Brahmin communities like Karhad Brahmins and the rest are a combination of Konkanastha Brahmins (Chitpavans). Other castes are Konkan Kshatriya Chardos, Vaishya Vanis, Kunbis, Gaudas, etc.

See also
Villages and Agraharas in Goa and their ancient names
Konkani Brahmins
Caste in Goa

References

Further reading 
 "The Goa Inquisition" by A. K. Priolkar